Yung Wing (November 17, 1828April 21, 1912) was a Chinese-American diplomat and businessman. In 1854, he became the first Chinese student to graduate from an American university, Yale College. He was involved in business transactions between China and the United States and brought students from China to study in the United States on the Chinese Educational Mission. He became a naturalized American citizen, but his status was later revoked under the Naturalization Act of 1870.

Early life

After receiving his early education at a Mission School in Canton, Yung studied at Yale College to become, in 1854, the first-known Chinese student to graduate from an American university.  He was a member and librarian of Brothers in Unity, a prominent Yale student literary society. His time at Yale was sponsored by Samuel Robbins Brown (1810–1880).  In 1851, at the end of his freshman year, Yung wrote to Albert Booth, a fellow alumnus of Munson Academy and "old Yale, where you have the satisfaction + honor to have gone through."  Yung asked for Booth's help in acquiring study materials and stated, "Now you know probably the many disadvantages in which I labor aside from these additional studies."  He was a member of the Phi chapter of the Delta Kappa Epsilon fraternity.

After finishing his studies, Yung returned to the Qing dynasty and worked with western missionaries as an interpreter.  He was thought perhaps the first Chinese person to almost entirely master the English language.

Republican activism

In 1859, he accepted an invitation to the court of the Taiping rebels in Nanjing, but his proposals aimed at increasing the efficiency of the Taiping Heavenly Kingdom were all eventually refused. In 1863, Yung was dispatched to the United States by Zeng Guofan to buy machinery necessary for opening an arsenal in China capable of producing heavy weapons comparable with those of the western powers. The arsenal later became Jiangnan Shipyard.

He persuaded the Qing dynasty government to send young Chinese to the United States to study science and engineering. With the government's eventual approval, he organized what came to be known as the Chinese Educational Mission, which included 120 young Chinese students, to study in the New England region of the United States beginning in 1872. The Educational Mission was disbanded in 1881, but many of the students later returned to China and made significant contributions to China's civil services, engineering, and the sciences.

In 1874, he and the Hartford Pastor Joseph Twichell traveled to Peru to investigate the living conditions of Chinese coolies working there. Conditions were very brutal for the Chinese, and led to strikes and violent suppression.

Yung was a lifelong supporter of reform in China. He had followed the lead of the Guangxu Emperor, whom Yung described as the great pioneer of reform in China. The coup d'état of 1898 by the Empress Dowager Cixi aborted the Hundred Days' Reform, and many of the reformers were decapitated. A price of $70,000 was placed on Yung's head and he fled Shanghai to British Hong Kong.

While in Hong Kong, he applied to the US Consul to return to the US. In a 1902 letter from the US Secretary of State John Sherman, Yung was informed that his US citizenship, which he had held for 50 years, had been revoked and he would not be allowed to return to the United States. Through the help of friends, he was able to sneak into the United States in time to see his youngest son, Bartlett, graduate from Yale.

In 1908, Yung joined "General" Homer Lea, the former American military advisor to Kang Youwei, in a bold and audacious military venture in China called the "Red Dragon Plan" that called for organizing a revolutionary conspiracy to conquer Liangguang. Through Yung, Lea planned to solicit a united front of various southern Chinese factions and secret societies to organize an army that he would command for the revolution. If successful, Yung was slated to head a coalition government of revolutionary forces while Lea and his fellow conspirators hoped to receive wide-ranging economic concessions from the new government. The Red Dragon conspiracy subsequently collapsed.

After the Wuchang Uprising in the late fall of 1911, Sun Yat Sen wrote to Yung Wing requesting help to build the newly founded Republic of China; however, Yung was unable to go due to old age and illness. He requested his two sons to go in his place.

Family and legacy
Yung was naturalized as an American citizen on October 30, 1852, and in 1876, he married Mary Kellogg, an American. They had two children: Morrison Brown Yung and Bartlett Golden Yung. At Yale's centennial commencement in 1876, Yung received an honorary Doctor of Laws.

After the failed 1908 uprising, Yung lived his twilight years  in poverty in Hartford, Connecticut, and died in 1912. His grave is located at Cedar Hill Cemetery in Hartford.

P.S. 124, a public elementary school at 40 Division St. in Chinatown in New York City, is named after Yung.

Yung had been considered as a possible namesake for one of Yale University's new colleges to be completed in 2017.

In the prefecture city of Zhuhai, Guangdong, Yung Wing's hometown, there is a private school named in honor of Yung Wing, the Yung Wing School - one of the most elite schools in the city. There is also a Yung Wing International Kindergarten there.

Works

References

Further reading
 Edward J.M. Rhoads, Stepping Forth into the World the Chinese Educational Mission to the United States, 1872–81 (Hong Kong: Hong Kong Univ. Pr., 2011).
 Liel Leibovitz, Matthew I. Miller, Fortunate Sons: The 120 Chinese Boys Who Came to America, Went to School, and Revolutionized an Ancient Civilization (New York: W.W. Norton,  2011).

External links 

 The Yung Wing Project
 Yung Wing papers (MS 602). Manuscripts and Archives, Yale University Library.
 CEM Connections presents basic data and photos of the 120 students of the Chinese Educational Mission.
 The Red Dragon Scheme  reveals the last chapter of Yung's life.
 Yale Obituary Record

1828 births
1912 deaths
American people of Chinese descent
Burials at Cedar Hill Cemetery (Hartford, Connecticut)
Naturalized citizens of the United States
People from Zhuhai
Former United States citizens
Qing dynasty emigrants to the United States
Wilbraham & Monson Academy alumni
Yale College alumni